Sébastien Zamet (1588 in Paris – 2 February 1655 in Mussy-sur-Seine) was a French Roman Catholic bishop, monastery reformer and early actor in the Jansenism dispute.

Works 

 Lettres spirituelles de Sébastien Zamet, évêque-duc de Langres, pair de France. Published by Louis-Nicolas Prunel. A. Picard, Paris 1911–1912.

Literature 

 Louis Narcisse Prunel (1874–1932): Sébastien Zamet, évêque-duc de Langres, pair de France, 1588-1655. Sa vie et ses œuvres. Les origines du jansénisme. A. Picard, Paris 1912, online.
 Paul Broutin: La réforme pastorale en France au XVIIe siècle. Recherches sur la tradition pastorale après le Concile de Trente. Bd. 1. Desclée, Paris 1956, p. 119–136.

External links 

 Entry of Sébastien Zamet in the databank of the Bibliothèque nationale de France
 Entry of Sébastien Zamet on Catholic-Hierarchy.org
 Literature from and about Sébastien Zamet in the catalogue of the Système universitaire de documentation

1588 births
1655 deaths